Belgrave (Puffing Billy) railway station is situated in Belgrave, a suburb of Melbourne in the Australian state of Victoria. It is the inner terminal of the famous Puffing Billy heritage steam railway.

Belgrave (Puffing Billy) is adjacent to, and forms an interchange with, Belgrave suburban railway station, which is the outer terminal of the Belgrave line of Melbourne's broad gauge (5 ft 3in) electric suburban network. The suburban station is accessible via a short footpath. Before this station was built, the original narrow gauge line ran from the original site of the narrow-gauge station (approximately where the existing Metro station car park is) to Selby station.

Gallery

See also
 Puffing Billy Railway

External links 
 Melway map
 Official website

Tourist railway stations in Melbourne
Railway stations in the Shire of Yarra Ranges